Charles Lloyd (born March 15, 1938) is an American jazz musician. Though he primarily plays tenor saxophone and flute, he has occasionally recorded on other reed instruments, including alto saxophone and the Hungarian tárogató. Lloyd's primary band since 2007 has been a quartet including pianist Jason Moran, acoustic bassist Reuben Rogers, and drummer Eric Harland.

Early life and education

Charles Lloyd was born and grew up in Memphis, Tennessee, United States, and was exposed to blues, gospel and jazz. He is of African, Cherokee, Mongolian, and Irish ancestry. He was given his first saxophone at the age of nine and was riveted by 1940s radio broadcasts by Charlie Parker, Coleman Hawkins, Lester Young, Billie Holiday and Duke Ellington. His early teachers included pianist Phineas Newborn, Jr. and saxophonist Irvin Reason. His closest childhood friend was trumpeter Booker Little. As a teenager Lloyd played jazz with saxophonist George Coleman, Harold Mabern, and Frank Strozier, and was a sideman for blues artists Bobby "Blue" Bland, Howlin' Wolf and B.B. King, and R & B singer Johnny Ace.

In 1956, Lloyd left Memphis for Los Angeles to earn a degree in music at the University of Southern California, where he studied with Bartók specialist Halsey Stevens. At night, he played in jazz clubs with Ornette Coleman, Billy Higgins, Scott LaFaro, Don Cherry, Charlie Haden, Eric Dolphy, Bobby Hutcherson and other leading west coast jazz artists. He also was a member of Gerald Wilson's big band.

Career 
In 1960, Lloyd was invited to become music director of Chico Hamilton's group, when Eric Dolphy left to join Charles Mingus's band. The Hungarian guitarist Gábor Szabó, bassist Albert "Sparky" Stinson, and trombonist Charles Bohanan soon joined Lloyd in the band. Hamilton's albums on Impulse!, Passin' Thru and Man from Two Worlds, featured music arranged and written almost entirely by Lloyd. He collaborated with Nigerian drummer Babatunde Olatunji, with whom he played when he was not on the road with Hamilton. He joined the Cannonball Adderley Sextet in 1964, and performed with Nat Adderley, Joe Zawinul, Sam Jones and Louis Hayes. For two years he remained with Cannonball Adderley, whom he credits in his own development as a leader.

In 1964, Lloyd signed with CBS Records and began to record as a leader. His Columbia recordings, Discovery! (1964), and Of Course, Of Course (1965), led to his being voted DownBeat magazine's "New Star." He was also one of the well known and notable supporting musicians of The Beach Boys in their live performances. Of Course, Of Course was reissued by Mosaic Records in 2006.

In March 2021, Blue Note released Tone Poem, the third album by Charles Lloyd & the Marvels. In addition to three new Lloyd originals, it features compositions by Leonard Cohen, Ornette Coleman, Thelonious Monk, Bola de Nieve, and Gábor Szabó.

Quartet 
In New York in 1966, Lloyd formed his "classic quartet" with drummer Jack DeJohnette, pianist Keith Jarrett and bassist Cecil McBee (continued on by Ron McClure). The Quartet's 1966 live album, Forest Flower, recorded at the Monterey Jazz Festival, was one of the most successful jazz recordings of the mid-1960s, building a heterogeneous audience of rock as well as jazz fans in the prospering hippie counterculture. The Quartet toured across America and Europe. In 1967, Lloyd was voted "Jazz Artist of the Year" by DownBeat magazine.

Lloyd is given credit for anticipating world music by incorporating music from other cultures into his compositions, as early as the late 1950s. He describes his music as having "danced on many shores". Peter Watrous stated, "Lloyd has come up with a strange and beautiful distillation of the American experience, part abandoned and wild, part immensely controlled and sophisticated."

Despite recording several albums during the 1970s and occasionally appearing as a sideman, he practically disappeared from the jazz scene. While practicing Transcendental Meditation in the 1970s, Lloyd played extensively with The Beach Boys, both on their studio recordings and as a member of their touring band; several members of the group shared his affinity for the technique. Lloyd recorded at Brian Wilson's home studio during this period and has recalled that Brian and several other members of The Beach Boys performed on these recordings, some of which (e.g. "All Life Is One") were included on Lloyd's 1971 LP 'Warm Waters', and which also featured Quicksilver Messenger Service lead guitarist John Cipollina. Lloyd also was a member of Celebration, a band consisting of members of the Beach Boys' touring band as well as Mike Love and Al Jardine. Celebration released two albums.

Lloyd returned to the jazz world in 1981 when he toured with Michel Petrucciani. British jazz critic Brian Case called Lloyd's return "one of the events of the 1980s." The group produced a special edition cassette, Night Blooming Jasmine, and two live records, Montreux 82 and A Night in Copenhagen, which also features Bobby McFerrin. After the tour, Lloyd again retreated to Big Sur.

In 1986, after being hospitalized with a nearly fatal medical condition, Lloyd rededicated himself to music. When he regained his strength in 1988, he formed a new quartet with Swedish pianist Bobo Stenson. When Lloyd returned to the Montreux Festival in 1988, Swiss critic Yvan Ischer wrote: "To see and hear Charles Lloyd in concert is always an event, not only because this saxophonist has been at quite a few crossroads, but also because he seems to hold an impalpable truth which makes him a thoroughly original musician...This is what we call grace."

Recording for ECM 
In 1989, Lloyd made his first recording for ECM Records, Fish Out of Water. Manfred Eicher, ECM's founder and producer, compared the recording to a Giacometti painting, saying, "I really believe this is the refined essence of what music should be. All the meat is gone, only the bones remain." From 1989, Lloyd toured and recorded for ECM. His albums for the label include Canto, Voice in the Night, The Water Is Wide (featuring Brad Mehldau, John Abercrombie, Larry Grenadier and Billy Higgins), Lift Every Voice (featuring Geri Allen), and the live Rabo de Nube (with Jason Moran).

Lloyd's albums for ECM contain elements of world music and experimentation, as in the duets on Which Way Is East with his longtime friend, Billy Higgins.

Mirror, his second recording with the New Quartet (2010), has been called a "Charles Lloyd classic." Rabo de Nube, also on ECM, captured the quartet "live" at its inception, and was voted No. 1 recording for the 2008 JazzTimes Reader's and Critic's Poll.

Lloyd collaborated with the classical Greek singer, Maria Farantouri, for a concert at the Herodion Theater at the Acropolis. Ta Nea. A newspaper in Athens, stated "Music has no borders...The audience was filled with a Dionysian ecstasy. While the music had reminiscences of a Hypiros fair, at the same time it took you to the heart of New York City." This concert was recorded and Athens Concert was released by ECM in 2011.

Lloyd celebrated his 75th birthday in 2013 with concerts in the Temple of Dendur at the Metropolitan Museum of Art in New York City and the Kennedy Center Concert Hall in Washington, D.C. On June 25, 2014 it was announced that Lloyd was to receive the NEA Jazz Masters Award 2015. Lloyd was the Honoree at the 2014 Monterey Jazz Festival Jazz Legends Gala, hosted by Herbie Hancock. Lloyd was the recipient of the 2014 Alfa Jazz Fest International Music Award. In January 2015, it was announced that Lloyd had signed with Blue Note Records. Wild Man Dance, a live recording of a long-form suite commissioned by the Jazztopad Festival in Wroclaw, Poland, was released in April 2015. Lloyd was presented with an honorary Doctor of Music degree from the Berklee College of Music in a ceremony at the Umbria Jazz Festival in July 2015. In 2016, Lloyd was inducted into the Memphis Music Hall of Fame.

Personal life
Lloyd lives in Southern California with his wife, Dorothy Darr.

Discography

As leader

Main source:

As sideman

Filmography
 The Monk and the Mermaid - A documentary film by Fara C & Giuseppe De Vecchi - Oleo films - Forest Farm + Art - Mezzo TV - 2008
 Arrows Into Infinity - A film by Dorothy Darr & Jeffery Morse - Forest Farm + Art - 2013
 LOVE LONGING LOSS - At Home with Charles Lloyd During a Year of the Plague - A film by Dorothy Darr - Pierre Boulez SAAL - 2021

References

External links

 
 Jazz.com Biography
 Interview with Charles Lloyd
 Charles Lloyd on ECM Records
 Fotos Charles Lloyd Trio – Jazzit Salzburg April 2007
 Jazz Times interview

Avant-garde jazz musicians
African-American jazz musicians
American jazz tenor saxophonists
American male saxophonists
American jazz flautists
Jazz musicians from California
Musicians from Memphis, Tennessee
1938 births
Living people
The Beach Boys backing band members
ECM Records artists
Atlantic Records artists
A&M Records artists
Blue Note Records artists
Columbia Records artists
Elektra Records artists
20th-century saxophonists
American male jazz musicians
Cannonball Adderley Quintet members
Resonance Records artists
20th-century American musicians
20th-century American male musicians
21st-century American saxophonists
21st-century American male musicians
20th-century flautists
21st-century flautists